is a retired Japanese professional baseball player and the former manager of Brother Elephants. In 2010, he was convicted of 5 charges of match fixing as a part of the 2009 game-fixing scandal and sentenced to 20 months in prison.

Baseball career

NPB

CPBL

As player

As manager

External links

 
 

1970 births
Living people
Baseball people from Yamanashi Prefecture
Japanese expatriate baseball players in Taiwan
Hanshin Tigers players
Brother Elephants players
21st-century Japanese criminals
Sportspeople convicted of crimes
Match fixers